The 1923–24 season saw Rochdale compete for their 3rd season in the Football League Third Division North. Prior to the start of the season, the club were expelled from the F.A. because a former player had not been paid, however they were re-instated when it was confirmed that the player was on holiday when the money was sent.

Statistics

     
 

 

 
  
     
  
 

|-
|}

Final league table

Competitions

Football League Third Division North

FA Cup

Lancashire Cup

Manchester Cup

References

Rochdale A.F.C. seasons
Rochdale